Tony C. Caputo is an American author, visual artist, entrepreneur, and former publisher.

Career
In 1985, Caputo founded NOW Comics and NOW Entertainment Corporation, a multimedia company that published comic books, children's periodicals, trade paperback books, and home videos of such characters as Speed Racer, the Terminator, The Real Ghostbusters, Mr. T & the T-Force, and The Green Hornet. Caputo ran NOW until 1994, briefly reviving the company from 2003–2005. While working there, he authored the graphic novel Vespers, and wrote an article on the American comic book market, which included detailed market share reports for the first time. Caputo left the entertainment business in 1994, and moved into information technology, first with Ahrens Interactive in 1995, and then with HyperLOCK in 1996.

Books and articles
Caputo's nonfiction books include How To Self-Publish Your Own Comic Book (Watson-Guptill), Visual Storytelling: The Art and the Technique, Build Your Own Server (McGraw-Hill) and Digital Video Surveillance and Security (Elsevier/Reed). His articles have been published by ICv2.com.

References

Living people
Comic book publishers (people)
Year of birth missing (living people)